James "Spanish" Blake, Anglo-Irish merchant, soldier, and spy, born after 1560, died 20 February 1630.

A member of one of The Tribes of Galway, Blake was the second son of Walter Blake (died 1575) and Juliana Browne. His grandfather and brothers served as Mayors of Galway; his elder brother, Valentine Blake (1560–1634) was created a baronet in 1622.

In 1587, Blake was trading in sack and acquavite from Spain. The following year, he worked salvaging material from ships of the Armada wrecked on the Irish coast. He moved through the world of international intrigue as an agent for, variously, the Irish, English, French and Spanish during the Nine Years War in the 1590s.

He has been named as the assassin of Red Hugh O'Donnell in Spain in 1602. He was in the company of O'Donnell at the time of his death, and offered his services to Sir George Carew for the plot.

References

 Old Galway, Maureen Donovan O'Sullivan, 1942.
 Spanish Blake, in Irish Leaders and Learning Through the Ages by Paul Walsh, ed. by Nollaig Ó Muraíle, 2003. 
 Dictionary of Irish Biography, p. 584, Cambridge, 2010
 Martyn, Adrian (2016). The Tribes of Galway:1124-1642

1635 deaths
People from County Galway
Irish spies
People of the Nine Years' War
Irish soldiers
16th-century Anglo-Irish people
17th-century Anglo-Irish people
Year of birth unknown
16th-century spies
17th-century spies